This is a list of the Austria national football team results from 1930 to 1959.

1930

1931

1932

1933

1934

1935

1936

1937

1945

1946

1947

1948

1949

1950

1951

1952

1953

1954

1955

1956

1957

1958

1959

See also
Austria national football team results (1902–1929)
Austria national football team results (1960–1979)

External links
Results at RSSSF 

1930s in Austria
1940s in Austria
1950s in Austria
1930